The Dutch Boy Group is a paint manufacturing company currently headquartered in Cleveland, Ohio. Founded in 1907 by the National Lead Company, the Dutch Boy Paints brand is currently a subsidiary of the Consumer Group division of the Sherwin-Williams Company, which acquired it in 1980, two years after the U.S. Consumer Product Safety Commission's directive banning the manufacturing of lead housepaint went into effect.

Trademark 

Dutch Boy uses a stylized Dutch child as its trademark. He was painted by Lawrence Carmichael Earle and modeled after an Irish-American lad who lived near him named Michael Edward Brady.

Products 
Ceiling paints
Exterior paints
Faux finishes
Interior paints
Paint samples
Primers
Porch and Floor

References

External links

Paint and coatings companies of the United States
Manufacturing companies based in Ohio
American companies established in 1907
Chemical companies established in 1907
1907 establishments in Ohio